Epipsestis stueningi is a moth in the family Drepanidae. It is found in Yunnan, China.

The wingspan is 30–35 mm. The forewings are pale whitish grey to brownish grey, with a brown median area. The hindwings are pale brownish grey with a darker outer half.

References

Moths described in 1988
Thyatirinae